The Pahvant Range (also Pavant Range) is a mountain range in central Utah, United States, east of Fillmore.

Description
The range is named for the Pahvant tribe, a branch of the Ute people. Most of the land in the Pavant range is part of Fishlake National Forest. 

Richfield lies in the Sevier River valley to the southeast of the range and Fillmore lies in the Pavant Valley along the northwest side of the range.

The Pavant Range merges into the Tushar Mountains on the south.

Transportation
Interstate 15 crosses the extreme north end of the range at Scipio pass, near Scipio. Interstate 70 crosses at a pass between the Pavant Range and the Tushar Mountains to the south.

Meteorite
Iron meteorite fragments with a mass of  named the Salina Meteorite were found in the Pavant Range in 1908.

References

External links

  Utah Forest Alliance - Pavant Range

Fishlake National Forest
Mountain ranges of Millard County, Utah
Mountain ranges of Sevier County, Utah
Mountain ranges of the Great Basin
Mountain ranges of Utah